Django may refer to:

Arts and entertainment

Film
 Django (1966 film), a 1966 Italian Western by Sergio Corbucci which had a particular influence on the Spaghetti Western genre and a number of unofficial prequels and sequels
 Django, Prepare a Coffin, alternatively titled Viva Django, a 1968 Italian Spaghetti Western directed by Ferdinando Baldi
 W Django!, a 1971 Italian Spaghetti Western
 Django Strikes Again, 1987 Italian Western
Django Unchained, a 2012 American revisionist Western film by Quentin Tarantino
Django Unchained (soundtrack), the 2012 film's soundtrack
 Sukiyaki Western Django, a 2008 Japanese western film directed by Takashi Miike
 Django (2017 film), a 2017 French film

Television
 Django (TV series), an upcoming show

Music
 Animal Liberation Orchestra, an American rock band, originally known as Django (in 1989)
 "Django" (composition), a 1954 composition by jazz pianist John Lewis
 Young Django, a 1979 album by jazz violinist Stéphane Grappelli, a collaborator with Django Reinhardt
 "Django", a song by Rancid on the 2003 album Indestructible
 "Django!!! -Genwaku no Django-", a song by Buck-Tick on the album Razzle Dazzle
 "Django", a 2018 single by Dadju
 "Django Jane", a song by Janelle Monáe on the 2018 album Dirty Computer
 Django (album), 1956, by the Modern Jazz Quartet
 Django Django, a British art rock group
 Django and Jimmie, a 2016 album by Willie Nelson and Merle Haggard
 "D is for Django the Bastard", a track from The Letters EP by Northern Irish band And So I Watch You from Afar

Characters
 Django (character), a character who appears in the 1966 film of the same name, and whose name was used for a multitude of unauthorized sequel and prequel films.
 Django (One Piece), a character in the manga One Piece
 Django, a character in the video game Boktai
 Django, a vehicle in the Japanese animated series Burst Angel
 Django, a character in the video game Ehrgeiz
 Django of the Dead, a character in the animation series El Tigre: The Adventures of Manny Rivera
 Django Brown, a character in the American animated series Phineas and Ferb
 Django, a character of the 2007 film Ratatouille

Computing
 Django (web framework), written in Python
 Django (music software), for engraving of tabulature for instruments

People

First name
 Django Bates (born 1960), English musician and composer
 Django Haskins (born 1973), American singer-songwriter
 Django Reinhardt (1910–1953), Belgian-born, pioneering virtuoso jazz guitarist and composer
 Django Walker (born 1981), American country singer-songwriter
 Django Lovett (born 1992), Canadian male track and field athlete

Others
 Djaŋu, Australian Aboriginal group of the Yolŋu people, also spelt Django
 Django, nickname of Francisco Bustamante (born 1963), Filipino pocket billiards player
 King Django (born Jeffrey Baker), American ska musician

See also
 DWANGO (Dial-up Wide-Area Network Game Operation), an early online US gaming service
 Dyango (born 1940), Spanish musician
 Jango (disambiguation)